George "Babe" Hooker was an Australian professional rugby league footballer who played in the 1900s. He played in the New South Wales Rugby League (NSWRL).

Hooker played for the Eastern Suburbs club in the 1909 season.

References

 The Encyclopedia of Rugby League; Alan Whiticker and Glen Hudson

Australian rugby league players
Sydney Roosters players
Year of death missing
19th-century births
20th-century deaths
Year of birth missing
Place of birth missing